John Bingham (1613–1673) was an English politician who sat in the House of Commons  between 1645 and 1659. He served in the Parliamentary army in the English Civil War.

Bingham was the son of Richard Bingham, of Bingham's Melcombe, Dorset, and his wife Jane Hopton, daughter of Sir Arthur Hopton. He matriculated at Brasenose College, Oxford, on 9 December 1631, aged 18. He was a student of the Middle Temple in 1632.

In the Civil War, Bingham was colonel of a regiment of the parliamentary army and Bingham's Melcombe was used as the headquarters of the local parliamentary forces. He was governor of Poole, and took part in the siege of Corfe Castle. He was elected Member of Parliament for Shaftesbury in 1645 in the Long Parliament and survived Pride's Purge to serve in the Rump Parliament.  He was nominated MP for Dorset in 1653 for the Barebones Parliament and elected MP for Dorset in 1654, 1656 and 1658 for the First, Second and Third Protectorate Parliaments.

He was Governor of Guernsey from 1651 to 1660.

Bingham married  firstly Frances Trenchard, daughter of John Trenchard, and secondly Jane Norwood of Gloucestershire. He had no male heir and was succeeded by his nephew Richard.

References

 

1615 births
1673 deaths
People from Dorset
Alumni of Brasenose College, Oxford
Members of the Middle Temple
Parliamentarian military personnel of the English Civil War
English MPs 1640–1648
English MPs 1648–1653
English MPs 1653 (Barebones)
English MPs 1654–1655
English MPs 1656–1658
English MPs 1659